Thisbe is a character in Greek mythology who is either 
Thisbe (Nymph), The Boeotian nymph

Thisbe forming the couple Pyramus and Thisbe.

Thisbe may also refer to:
 Thisbe (Boeotia), a town of ancient Boeotia 
 Thisvi, a Greek town called Thisbe in ancient times
 88 Thisbe, one of the largest main belt asteroids
 Thisbe Nissen (born 1972), American author
 Tishbe, the birthplace of the prophet Elijah
 HMS Thisbe, the name of four Royal Navy warships
 Thisbe (butterfly), a genus of metalmark butterflies in the tribe Nymphidiini, subtribe Lemoniadina